Pun Wai-yan (born 6 April 1995) is a Hong Kong rugby union player. She was selected for Hong Kong's squad to the 2017 Women's Rugby World Cup.

Pun featured at the 2017 Asia Rugby Women's Championship in both matches against Japan. She was named in Hong Kong's European Tour squad to face Wales and Spain in 2018. The 2019 Asia Pacific Championship saw her go up against Fiji and Samoa in Lautoka.

References 

1995 births
Living people
Hong Kong people
Hong Kong rugby union players
Hong Kong female rugby union players